This is a list of universities in Antigua and Barbuda.

Universities 

 University of the West Indies at Five Islands 
 American University of Antigua 
 University of Health Sciences Antigua

See also 
 List of universities by country
 List of schools in Antigua and Barbuda

 
Antigua
Antigua

Universities